The White Primrose (Italian: La primula bianca) is a 1947 Italian comedy film directed by Carlo Ludovico Bragaglia and starring Carlo Campanini, Carlo Ninchi and Andrea Checchi.

Cast
 Carlo Campanini as Felice Moretti 
 Carlo Ninchi as Capo Banda 
 Andrea Checchi as Il Poliziotto 
 Laura Gore as Amica del Capo Banda
 Manlio Busoni as Ispettore di Polizia 
 Paolo Monelli as Direttore del Giornale 
 Mirella Monti as Figlia del Capobanda 
 Giulio Calì as Barista 
 Angelo Calabrese
 Giulio Battiferri
 Max Lancia
 Folco Lulli
 Nino Pavese
 Pina Piovani

References

Bibliography 
 Gundle, Stephen. Fame Amid the Ruins: Italian Film Stardom in the Age of Neorealism. Berghahn Books, 2019.

External links 
 

1947 films
Italian comedy films
1947 comedy films
1940s Italian-language films
Films directed by Carlo Ludovico Bragaglia
Lux Film films
Italian black-and-white films
1940s Italian films